Bunyole (sometimes called Bunhole) is one of the six traditional chiefdoms of the kingdom of Busoga in Uganda.

It became a part of the British protectorate in Busoga in 1896. Its ruler is known as the Nanyumba.

References 

History of Uganda
Busoga